{{DISPLAYTITLE:C8H10O2}}
The molecular formula C8H10O2 (molar mass: 138.164 g/mol) may refer to:

 Anisyl alcohol
 Creosol
 Dimethoxybenzenes
 1,2-Dimethoxybenzene
 1,3-Dimethoxybenzene
 1,4-Dimethoxybenzene
 Phenoxyethanol
 Tyrosol
 1-phenyl-1,2-ethanediol